Bee is an unincorporated community in Wilmington Township, Houston County, Minnesota, United States.

The community is located at the junction of Bee Hill Drive and Oakland Drive.

Bee Creek–Waterloo Creek flows through the community.  Nearby places in Minnesota include Spring Grove, Wilmington, Caledonia, and Eitzen.  Nearby places in Iowa include Dorchester and Waterloo Creek Wildlife Management Area.

First named Bergen, Bee had a post office from 1891 to 1905.  At one time, Bee had a flour mill, a store, a creamery, and a station on the former Chicago, Milwaukee and St. Paul Railroad.

References

External links
 Minnesota Historical Society information

Unincorporated communities in Minnesota
Unincorporated communities in Houston County, Minnesota